Antwoine is a given name. Notable people with the name include:

Antwoine Hackford (born 2004), English footballer
Antwoine Sanders (born 1977), American football player
Antwoine Womack (born 1978), American football player

See also

Antoine
Antwone
Antwaine Wiggins